Aq Bolagh or Aqbolagh or Agh Bolagh or Aghbolagh or Aq Bulagh or Aqbulaq or Aqbolaq may refer to:

Ardabil Province
Agh Bolagh, Ardabil
Aghbolagh, Ardabil, a village in Khalkhal County
Aq Bulagh, Ardabil, a village in Khalkhal County
Aq Bolagh, Ardabil, a village in Meshgin Shahr County
Aq Bolagh-e Aqajan Khan, a village in Ardabil County
Aq Bolagh-e Rostam Khan, a village in Ardabil County
Agh Bolagh-e Olya, a village in Meshgin Shahr County
Agh Bolagh-e Sofla, a village in Meshgin Shahr County
Agh Bolagh-e Mostafa Khan, a village in Namin County

Chaharmahal and Bakhtiari Province
Aqbolagh, Borujen, a village in Borujen County
Aqbolagh, Shahrekord, a village in Shahrekord County

East Azerbaijan Province
Aqbolagh, East Azerbaijan, a village in Ahar County
Aghbolagh, Bostanabad, a village in Bostanabad County
Aghbolagh, Charuymaq, a village in Charuymaq County
Agh Bolagh, Hashtrud, a village in Hashtrud County
Aghbolagh, Hashtrud, a village in Hashtrud County
Aghbolagh-e Hasan Kandi, a village in Hashtrud County
Aghbolagh-e Hashtrud, a village in Hashtrud County
Agh Bolagh, Jolfa, a village in Jolfa County
Aghbolagh-e Alamdar, a village in Maragheh County
Aghbolagh-e Fotuhi, a village in Maragheh County
Aghbolagh-e Olya, East Azerbaijan, a village in Maragheh County
Aghbolagh-e Sofla, Maragheh, a village in Maragheh County
Aqbolagh-e Bahman, a village in Sarab County
Aghbolagh, Varzaqan, a village in Varzaqan County
Aghbolagh-e Sofla, Varzaqan, a village in Varzaqan County

Hamadan Province
Aq Bolagh, Hamadan, a village in Asadabad County
Aq Bolagh-e Latgah, a village in Bahar County
Aq Bolagh-e Aqdaq, a village in Kabudarahang County
Aq Bolagh-e Morshed, a village in Kabudarahang County

Kermanshah Province
Aqbolagh, Kermanshah, a village in Sonqor County

Kurdistan Province
Aghbolagh-e Ali Akbar Khan, a village in Bijar County
Aghbolagh-e Hoseyn Khan, a village in Bijar County
Aghbolagh-e Taghamin, a village in Bijar County
Aq Bolagh-e Chang Almas, a village in Bijar County
Aq Bolagh, Dehgolan, a village in Dehgolan County
Aq Bolagh, Kowleh, a village in Divandarreh County
Aq Bolagh, Saral, a village in Divandarreh County
Aq Bolagh, Qorveh, a village in Qorveh County

Lorestan Province
Aqbolagh, Lorestan, a village in Azna County
Aq Bolagh-e Mohammad Vali, a village in Azna County

Markazi Province
Aqbolagh-e Sadat, a village in Shazand County
Aq Bolaq-e Mohammad Hoseyn Khan, a village in Shazand County

Qazvin Province
Aq Bolagh, Qazvin, a village in Takestan County

West Azerbaijan Province 
Aghbolagh-e Mokhur
Aghbolagh-e Suqqar
Aghbolagh-e Kalisa Kandi, a village in Chaldoran County
Aq Bolagh-e Meydan, a village in Chaldoran County
Aghbolagh, Khoy, a village in Khoy County
Aq Bolagh-e Olya, West Azerbaijan, a village in Khoy County
Aq Bolagh-e Sofla, a village in Khoy County
Aghbolagh-e Chamanlu, a village in Maku County
Agh Bolagh, Miandoab, a village in Miandoab County
Agh Bolagh, Oshnavieh, a village in Oshnavieh County
Aghbolagh-e Mokhur, a village in Showt County
Aghbolagh-e Hamadani, a village in Takab County
Aghbolagh-e Olya, West Azerbaijan, a village in Takab County
Aghbolagh, Urmia, a village in Urmia County
Aq Bolagh, Sumay-ye Beradust, a village in Urmia County

Zanjan Province
Aq Bolagh, Zanjan, a village in Ijrud County
Aq Bolagh-e Olya, Zanjan, a village in Khodabandeh County
Aqbolagh-e Sofla, a village in Khodabandeh County
Aqbolagh, Mahneshan, a village in Mahneshan County
Aqbolagh-e Hasanabad, a village in Mahneshan County
Aqbolagh-e Humeh, a village in Zanjan County
Aq Bolagh Rural District, in Zanjan Province

See also
Ak-Bulak (disambiguation)
Ağbulaq (disambiguation)
Akbulak (disambiguation)
Aq Bulaq (disambiguation)